The Providence Friars are the intercollegiate athletic teams that represent Providence College, located in Providence, Rhode Island. They compete in the Big East Conference (NCAA Division I) for every sport except for ice hockey, where they compete in Hockey East. The Big East Conference was founded in 1979 by former athletic director and men's basketball coach Dave Gavitt. On December 15, 2012, Providence and the other seven Catholic, non-FBS schools announced that they were departing the Big East for a new conference; on March 7, 2013, it was officially confirmed that Providence's new conference would operate under the Big East name. The women's volleyball team, which had been an associate member of the America East Conference before the Big East split, remained in that conference for one more season before joining the Big East for the 2014 season.

The school's men's and women's sports teams are called the Friars, after the Dominican Order that runs the school. They are the only collegiate team to use the name.

Overall, the program consists of 17 varsity sports, seven for men and ten for women: men's and women's basketball, men's and women's cross country, field hockey, men's and women's ice hockey, men's lacrosse, men's and women's soccer, softball, men's and women's swimming and diving, women's tennis, men's and women's track and field, and women's volleyball. The lacrosse team competed in the Metro Atlantic Athletic Conference through the 2009 season before joining the newly created Big East lacrosse league for 2010.

Former sports include football, which was offered from 1921 until World War II in 1941, and baseball, which was dropped due to Title IX in 1999. Other dropped sports include men's tennis and men's golf.

The school's biggest rivals are Boston University and Boston College in hockey and UConn and URI (Ocean State Rivalry) in the school's other sports, especially in soccer, swimming and diving, and basketball.

Teams

Discontinued sports

Football

Providence College had a varsity football program from 1921 to 1941.

Baseball
The Friars fielded a varsity baseball team from 1923 to 1999 when the sport was eliminated due to Title IX regulations.

NCAA team championships
Providence has won 3 NCAA team national championships.

Women's (2)
Cross Country (2):1995, 2013
Men's (1)
Ice Hockey (1): 2015
see also:
Big East Conference NCAA team championships
List of NCAA schools with the most NCAA Division I championships

Colors, mascot and fight songs

The Dominicans' use of black and white as the colors of their habits were passed on from the earliest days at Providence College as the school colors. Through the years, various highlight colors have come and gone, including yellow, red and gold; the current highlight color of silver dates to the introduction of the current logo in 2002. The current logo shows a cowled Friar in profile. It is used by all teams except the hockey teams, who have used the "Skating Friar" logo since 1973.

The nickname "Friars" dates back to 1929, when a Providence Journal article used the nickname in reference to the baseball team. Previously, the teams were variously known as "The Black and White" or "Dominicans." The Friars nickname comes from the short-form nickname of the Dominican Order, the "Blackfriars." There have been several versions of the Friar Dom mascot throughout the years, with the most recent dating to the 2000s. In 2017 the Friars reintroduced a costumed dalmatian mascot as a companion to Friar Dom; a prior version had existed in the late 1990s. Both are based on the traditional dalmatian mascot of both the college and the Dominican Order in general; dalmatians have been called "the watchdogs of the Lord." The most recent live dalmatian mascot on campus was Friar Boy V, who died in 2004.

The original Friars fight song was "Friar Away." However, in the 1950s, WPRO, the radio station that still carries Friar basketball games to this day, began using "When The Saints Go Marching In" as the theme music to their coverage of PC basketball games. The fans took to it so well that it has become the fight song of the college, with Friar Away slipping into obscurity, other than a brief attempted revival in the 1990s.

Facilities 
All teams compete on campus except for the men's basketball team who play at the Amica Mutual Pavilion in Downtown Providence, Rhode Island (however on rare occasions, the women's basketball team has also played "home" games at the Amica Mutual Pavilion, most notably for games against the University of Rhode Island (URI) in the Ocean State Rivalry or the University of Connecticut (UConn), where demand for tickets would be enough to warrant an arena larger than the 1,854-seat on-campus Alumni Hall.) along with the men’s and women’s cross country teams whose home course is the Mark Coogan Cross Country Course at Highland Park in Attleboro, Massachusetts.

References

External links